"Cowboys Don't Cry" is a song recorded by American country music artist Dude Mowrey. It was the only single from his 1991 debut album Honky Tonk. Mowrey's version charted at number 65 on the Hot Country Songs chart that year. The song was written by Jim Allison, Doug Gilmore, Bob Simon and Jeff Raymond.

It was later recorded by American country music artist Daron Norwood, and was released in April 1994 as the second single from his eponymous debut album. The song reached No. 24 on the Billboard Hot Country Singles & Tracks chart.

Chart performance

References

Songs about cowboys and cowgirls
1991 debut singles
1994 singles
Daron Norwood songs
Song recordings produced by James Stroud
Giant Records (Warner) singles
1991 songs